Nathaniel Lammons (born August 12, 1993) is an American tennis player. He has a career high ATP doubles ranking of World No. 41, achieved on 16 January 2023. Lammons has won two ATP doubles title. He has a career high ATP singles ranking of World No. 591, achieved on 14 January 2019.

Professional career

2021: Win over World No. 1 doubles team
At the 2021 US Open partnering Jackson Withrow they defeated top pair Nikola Mektić and Mate Pavić in the first round in 75 minutes.

2022: Two titles, top 50 debut
He reached his maiden final at the 2022 Chile Open with André Göransson.

At the 2022 San Diego Open he won his first ATP title with Withrow defeating Jason Kubler and Luke Saville. The pair moved up 25 places to 35th in the doubles race. He made his top 60 debut in the rankings at world No. 55 on 26 September 2022.

At the 2022 Korea Open (tennis) he partnered Raven Klaasen to win his second title in two weeks defeating Nicolas Barrientos and Miguel Angel Reyes-Varela in straight sets. He moved another 7 positions up to reach the top 50 in the doubles rankings at world No. 48 on 3 October 2022.

The pair ended the season at No. 32 in the ATP doubles Rankings.

2023: Three ATP finals
With Withrow he reached the final at the ATP 500 at the Mexican Open in Acapulco.

ATP career finals

Doubles: 7 (2 titles, 5 runner-ups)

Performance Timeline

Doubles

Challenger and Futures finals

Doubles: 43 (24–19)

References

External links
 
 

1993 births
Living people
American male tennis players
Sportspeople from Arlington, Texas
Tennis players from Dallas
SMU Mustangs men's tennis players
21st-century American people